Nagayasuguchi Dam is a gravity dam located in Tokushima prefecture in Japan. The dam is used for flood control and power production. The catchment area of the dam is 538.9 km2. The dam impounds about 224  ha of land when full and can store 54278 thousand cubic meters of water. The construction of the dam was started on 1950 and completed in 1955. The dam was renovated in 1998.

References

Dams in Tokushima Prefecture
1955 establishments in Japan